Sir Poynings More, 1st Baronet (1606–1649) was an English politician who sat in the House of Commons at various times between 1624 and 1640.

Early life 
More was the son of Sir Robert More (1581–1626), son of George More and Ann Poynings, and his wife Frances Lennard, daughter of Sampson Lennard of Knole, Kent, and Hurstmonceux, Sussex.

Career 
In 1624, More was elected Member of Parliament for Haslemere. He was re-elected MP for Haslemere in 1625 and 1626. In 1628 he was elected MP for Guildford  and sat until 1629 when Charles I decided to rule without parliament for eleven years. In November 1640, More was re-elected MP for Haslemere in the Long Parliament. He was created a baronet in 1642.

Death 
He sat in parliament until his death on 11 April 1649. He was buried on 13 April 1649 at Saint Nicolas Parish Church, Guildford, Surrey, England.

Personal life 
More married Elizabeth Rous, widow of Christopher Rous of Henham, Suffolk and daughter of Sir William Fitch of Woodham Walter, Essex. She died in 1666 and on 3 September 1666 was also buried at Saint Nicolas Parish Church. Their son William More (1643 – 24 July 1684) is buried at Saint Nicolas Parish Church, Guildford.

References

 
 

1606 births
1649 deaths
Baronets in the Baronetage of England
People from Guildford
People from Haslemere
English MPs 1624–1625
English MPs 1625
English MPs 1626
English MPs 1628–1629
English MPs 1640–1648